Francis Lewis (March 21, 1713 – December 31, 1802) was an American merchant and a Founding Father of the United States. He was a signatory of the United States Declaration of Independence and Articles of Confederation as a representative of New York in the Continental Congress.

Early life
Lewis was born in Llandaff, Wales, on March 21, 1713. He was the only child of Morgan Lewis and Anne Lewis (née Pettingale) of Newport. Lewis was educated at Westminster School in London.

Career
Lewis entered a mercantile house in London until he turned 21 and inherited some properties left by his father. Lewis sold the properties and used the proceeds to acquire merchandise, set sail for New York City, arriving there in 1734 or 1735. He left some of the goods in New York to be sold by Edward Annesley, his business partner, and brought the rest to Philadelphia.  After two years in Philadelphia, he returned to New York.

Lewis made several trans-Atlantic trips, visiting several northern European ports, Saint Petersburg, northern Scotland, and Africa. He was taken prisoner while he served as a British mercantile agent in 1756 and sent to France for imprisonment. On his release and his return home, he became active in politics.

Lewis was a member of the Committee of Sixty, a member of the New York Provincial Congress, and a delegate to the Continental Congress from 1775 to 1779. In 1776 he signed the United States Declaration of Independence, and in 1778 he signed the United States Articles of Confederation. In 1779, he served as the chairman of the Continental Board of Admiralty.

He helped his son Francis Lewis Jr. open a dry goods business named Francis Lewis and Son. His son Morgan served in the Continental Army during the Revolutionary War and later held many offices in New York State, including governor.

Personal life

In 1745, Lewis married to Elizabeth Annesley (died 1779), a sister of his business partner,  Thomas Annesley. Together, they were the parents of seven children, three of whom survived to adulthood:

 Ann Lewis (1748–1802), who married Captain George Robertson (1742–1791) of the British Royal Navy.
 Francis Lewis Jr. (1749–1814), who served as churchwarden of St George's Parish in Flushing, New York, from 1791 to 1794. He married Elizabeth Ludlow (d. 1831), daughter of Gabriel Ludlow, Esq.
 Morgan Lewis (1754–1844), who married Gertrude Livingston, the daughter of Judge Robert Livingston of Clermont. He was a governor and attorney general of New York.

In 1775, Lewis acquired and relocated his family to an estate located in Whitestone, in present-day Queens. The home was later destroyed in the American Revolutionary War by British soldiers, who also arrested his wife, Elizabeth, and denied her a change of clothing or adequate food for weeks while in captivity. Her hardships in captivity ruined her health and led to her death in 1778 after being released in a prisoner exchange.

Through his eldest surviving daughter Ann, he was a grandfather to Marianne Robertson (1779–1829), who married John Bird Sumner, the Archbishop of Canterbury and brother of Charles Richard Sumner, bishop of Winchester. Through his son Morgan, he was a grandfather of Margret Lewis (1780–1860), who married New York lawyer and politician Maturin Livingston and became parents to twelve children. Through his son Francis Jr., he was a grandfather of Gabriel Ludlow Lewis.

Death and legacy

Lewis died on December 31, 1802, although his memorial in Trinity Church Cemetery gives his year of death as 1803.

In Queens, New York, Francis Lewis High School and P.S. 79 "The Francis Lewis School" are named after Lewis. Francis Lewis Boulevard, which locals sometimes refer to as "Franny Lew" or "Franny Lewie," stretches almost the entire north/south length of the borough. Francis Lewis Park is located under the Queens approach of the Bronx-Whitestone Bridge. A masonic lodge, Francis Lewis #273, is located in Whitestone.

See also

 Memorial to the 56 Signers of the Declaration of Independence

References

External links

 
 

1713 births
1802 deaths
People from Llandaff
Continental Congressmen from New York (state)
18th-century American politicians
Members of the New York Provincial Congress
Signers of the Articles of Confederation
Signers of the United States Declaration of Independence
People educated at Westminster School, London
People of the Province of New York
Welsh emigrants to the United States
Welsh politicians
Burials at Trinity Church Cemetery
People from Whitestone, Queens
19th-century American Episcopalians
Founding Fathers of the United States